Max Bohm (1868 – September 19, 1923) was an American artist who spent much of his time in Europe.

Biography
 
Bohm was born in Cleveland, Ohio. He studied at the Académie Julian in Paris and travelled in Europe. Between 1895-1904 he made his home at the Etaples art colony. Described as a romantic visionary, his heroic depiction of Étaples fishermen received a gold medal at the Paris Salon in 1898. He went on to teach painting at a school in London until 1911 before returning to the United States to join the school of artists in Cape Cod.

Bohm became a National Academician in 1920, dying three years later in Provincetown, a town at the tip of Cape Cod. His paintings are among the collections of the Smithsonian Institution, the National Gallery of Art, and the Luxembourg Gallery in Paris; there is also a mural in his hometown at the Cuyahoga County Courthouse.

Bohm is a grandfather of artist Anne Packard.

References

External links

Paintings by Max Bohm, an exhibition catalog from The Metropolitan Museum of Art Libraries (fully available online as PDF)
Biographical Notes, a catalog of American artists containing additional information on Bohm (page 9).
A finding aid to the Max Bohm papers, 1873-1970, bulk 1880-1959, in Archives of American Art, Smithsonian Institution

1868 births
1923 deaths
Artists from Cleveland
19th-century American painters
American male painters
20th-century American painters
19th-century American male artists
20th-century American male artists